The Lisbon Agreement for the Protection of Appellations of Origin and their International Registration, signed on 31 October 1958, ensures that in member countries, appellations of origin receive protection when are protected in their country of origin. It lays down provisions for what qualifies as an appellation of origin, protection measures and establishes an International Register of Appellations of Origin, run by the World Intellectual Property Organization. The agreement came into force in 1966, and was revised at Stockholm (1967) and amended in 1979 and 2015. As of July 2022, 39 states are party to the convention and 1000 appellations of origin has been registered.

The agreements establish a Special Union under Article 19 of the Paris Convention for the Protection of Industrial Property (1883). Some aspects of the agreement have been superseded by the Agreement on Trade-Related Aspects of Intellectual Property Rights.

Geneva Act
In May 2015, the Geneva Act to the Agreement was adopted, formally extending protection to Geographical Indication and changing the name: Geneva Act of the Lisbon Agreement on Appellations of Origin and Geographical Indications. The act furthermore allows intergovernmental organisations to become parties. On 21 May the Act was signed by 13 states: Bosnia and Herzegovina, Burkina Faso, Congo, France, Gabon, Hungary, Mali, Nicaragua, Peru, Romania and Togo. It entered into force in 2020 following ratifications/accessions by 5 parties: Albania, Cambodia, European Union, North Korea and Samoa. As of 2022, the number of parties is 15.

Parties
The treaty applies mutually between the parties of the 1958 Lisbon Agreement and the 1967 Stockholm Act, but not between a party solely to the 1958 Agreement and another party solely to the 1967 Stockholm act. The Geneva Act entered into force in 2020, and only applies between the Geneva act parties. If a state is a party to multiple Lisbon instruments, then a registered appellation of origin registered under any of the instruments applies also to parties of the other instruments the state is a party to.

See also
Geographic indications

References

External links
Treaty text of 
Original 1958 Agreement (in French), 
1967 Stockholm Act (as revised in 1979 amendment)
1979 amendment
2015 Geneva act

Intellectual property treaties
Treaties concluded in 1958
Treaties entered into force in 1966
1958 in Portugal
Treaties of Albania
Treaties of Algeria
Treaties of Bosnia and Herzegovina
Treaties of the People's Republic of Bulgaria
Treaties of Burkina Faso
Treaties of the Republic of the Congo
Treaties of Cambodia
Treaties of Cape Verde
Treaties of Costa Rica
Treaties of Cuba
Treaties of the Czech Republic
Treaties of Czechoslovakia
Treaties of the Dominican Republic
Treaties of North Korea
Treaties of France
Treaties of Gabon
Treaties of Ghana
Treaties of Georgia (country)
Treaties of Haiti
Treaties of the Hungarian People's Republic
Treaties of Iran
Treaties of Israel
Treaties of Italy
Treaties of Ivory Coast
Treaties of Laos
Treaties of Mexico
Treaties of Moldova
Treaties of Montenegro
Treaties of North Macedonia
Treaties of Nicaragua
Treaties of Peru
Treaties of the Estado Novo (Portugal)
Treaties of Samoa
Treaties of Serbia and Montenegro
Treaties of Slovakia
Treaties of Togo
Treaties of Tunisia
Treaties entered into by the European Union
Treaties entered into by the African Intellectual Property Organization